The Northern California Open is a defunct WTA Tour affiliated tennis tournament played from 1986 to 1988. It was held in Berkeley, California in the United States in 1986 and in Aptos, California in the United States from 1987 to 1988. The tournament was played on outdoor hard courts.

Results

Singles

Doubles

References
 WTA Results Archive

 
Defunct tennis tournaments in the United States
Hard court tennis tournaments in the United States
WTA Tour